C group or variation, may refer to:

 C-group, in mathematics group theory
 C-Group culture (2400 BCE - 1550 BCE) an archaeological culture of Lower Nubia
 cgroups (control groups) in Linux kernel namespace
 CGroup, a subsidiary of Li & Fung

See also

 Group C (disambiguation)
 Group 3 (disambiguation)
 Group (disambiguation)
 C (disambiguation)